Barbara Ann "Bobbi" Martin (November 29, 1939 – May 2, 2000) was an American country  and pop music singer, songwriter, and guitarist. She grew up in Oslo, Minnesota and began her singing career in Baltimore, working her way up from local venues onto the national nightclub circuit.

Martin was born to Virginia Chaney (1919-1971) and an unknown father. Her mother refused to tell her the name of her birth father, something that haunted Bobbi her entire life. When Martin was 5, her mother married Allen C. Paulson (1920-1983) in Temple, Texas, whom she met while they were both in the military, and the family lived in his hometown of Oslo, Minnesota, on the North Dakota border. Bobbi had a half-brother, Terry Paulson, born in 1946. Martin was in the habit of representing herself as being four years younger.  Hence, she was 60 when she died. 

Martin recorded for Coral Records for several years before releasing her debut album, Don't Forget I Still Love You. The title track was a hit in the U.S., peaking at No. 2 on the Easy Listening (adult contemporary) chart and No. 19 on the Billboard Hot 100. A follow-up single "I Can't Stop Thinking of You", first introduced on the nationally televised Dean Martin Show won her the Cashbox Disc Jockey Poll as Most Promising Female Vocalist of 1965. While popular at nightclubs in Miami Beach, New York, Las Vegas and Puerto Rico, and on TV appearances with the Jackie Gleason, Ronnie Dove, Tonight, and Dean Martin Shows, it would be 5 years before she scored another hit with "For the Love of Him", from the album of the same name. This song went to No. 1 on the Adult Contemporary chart and No. 13 on the Hot 100. The singer charted many smaller regional, Bubbling Under Hot 100 and Easy Listening chart records up to 1972.

Martin died of cancer on May 2, 2000 at the Brighton Wood Knoll medical facility in Baltimore. Martin had one daughter, Shane Clements.

Discography
 Don't Forget I Still Love You (Coral Records, 1964) U.S. No. 127
 I Love You So (Coral Records, 1965)
 Harper Valley P.T.A. (United Artists UAS 6668, 1968)
 For the Love of Him (United Artists UAS 6700, 1969) No. 45 Country
 With Love (United Artists UAS 6755, 1970) U.S. No. 176
 Have You Ever Been Lonely (Vocalion VL 73906, Compilation, 1970)
 Tomorrow (Buddah Records, 1971)
 Thinking of You (Sunset, SUS-5319, 1971)

Singles

References

External links
 http://www.recordonline.com/apps/pbcs.dll/article?AID=/20070114/NEWS/70114102/-1/NEWS271989 A Times Herald Record article by Mike Levine cursorily outlines her bio

1943 births
2000 deaths
American women country singers
American country singer-songwriters
Singer-songwriters from New York (state)
People from Marshall County, Minnesota
20th-century American singers
Deaths from cancer in Maryland
20th-century American women singers
Country musicians from New York (state)
Singer-songwriters from Minnesota